Readsboro is the primary village and a census-designated place (CDP) in the town of Readsboro, Bennington County, Vermont, United States. As of the 2020 census, it had a population of 297, out of 702 in the entire town of Readsboro.

It is in southeastern Bennington County, in the southeast part of the town of Readsboro, mainly on the west side of the Deerfield River, a south-flowing tributary of the Connecticut River. Vermont Route 100 passes through the village, leading northwest  to Vermont Route 8 at Heartwellville and east  to Vermont Route 112 at Jacksonville.

References 

Populated places in Bennington County, Vermont
Census-designated places in Bennington County, Vermont
Census-designated places in Vermont